Hillcrest College (or Hillcrest, also informally referred to as Crest) is an independent, co-educational, boarding and day high school in Mutare, Zimbabwe. The school was established in 1985, two years after the establishment of Hillcrest Preparatory School. Alumni of Hillcrest College are referred to as Old Crestonians.

Hillcrest College is a member of the Association of Trust Schools (ATS) and the Headmistress is a member of the Conference of Heads of Independent Schools in Zimbabwe(CHISZ).

Academics
Hillcrest College offers programs developed by Cambridge International Examinations which include Cambridge Secondary Checkpoint, Cambridge IGCSE, Cambridge International AS/A Level.

Notable alumni 
Jacques Leitao - Zimbabwe Sevens Rugby Captain 
Ozias Bvute - Member of Parliament (2018) 
Tinotenda Mawoyo - Zimbabwe International Cricketer 
Dave Ewers - Exeter Chiefs rugby player

See also

 List of boarding schools
 List of schools in Zimbabwe

References

External links
 
 Hillcrest College Profile on the ATS website
 

Private schools in Zimbabwe
Co-educational schools in Zimbabwe
High schools in Zimbabwe
Boarding schools in Zimbabwe
Day schools in Zimbabwe
Cambridge schools in Zimbabwe
Educational institutions established in 1985
1985 establishments in Zimbabwe
Member schools of the Association of Trust Schools
Mutare
Education in Manicaland Province